The São Paulo International Marathon is an annual road-based marathon hosted by São Paulo, Brazil, since 1995.  It was categorized as a Bronze Label Road Race by the International Association of Athletics Federations, and is the first race in Brazil to have achieved this distinction.  The marathon is also a member of the Association of International Marathons and Distance Races.  During the race weekend, a half marathon, a 10K race, and a 5K race are also offered.

History 

The marathon was won by Brazilian runner Luíz Antônio dos Santos and Russian runner Nadezhda Wijenberg, with finish times of 2:17:11 and 2:39:33, respectively.

Course 

All the races start and finish in Ibirapuera Park.

See also 
 Saint Silvester Road Race

Notes

References

External links 
 Official website for the 2023 race

1995 establishments in Brazil
April sporting events
Marathons in Brazil
Recurring sporting events established in 1995
International sports competitions in São Paulo

pt:Maratona Internacional de São Paulo